Javier Ciáurriz Ciáurriz (born 5 March 1946) is a Spanish footballer. He competed in the men's tournament at the 1968 Summer Olympics.

References

External links
 

1946 births
Living people
Spanish footballers
Olympic footballers of Spain
Footballers at the 1968 Summer Olympics
Footballers from Pamplona
Association football midfielders
Deportivo Alavés players
CD Logroñés footballers
Segunda División players
CA Osasuna players